Zach Jackson may refer to:

 Zach Jackson (pitcher, born 1983), American former baseball player
 Zach Jackson (pitcher, born 1994), American baseball player
 Zach Jackson (soccer) (born 1996), American soccer player
 Zach Jackson (basketball), American basketball player